Domestic violence in South Africa has been viewed as a taboo subject until recently. In 2012, just over one-third of violent crimes committed against women ended in criminal prosecution. Legislation has been passed to help improve the quality of life for victims of abuse and to prevent further abuse from taking place. Although the movement against domestic violence is a relatively new movement, it has been making great strides in the country since the 1990s.

Domestic violence
The South African Domestic Violence Act 1998 defines domestic violence as: Physical abuse; sexual abuse; emotional, verbal and psychological abuse; economic abuse; intimidation; harassment; stalking; damage to property; entry into the complainant's residence without consent, where the parties do not share the same residence; or any other controlling or abusive behaviour towards a complainant, where such conduct harms, or may cause imminent harm to, the safety, health or wellbeing of the complainant.

Background
The South African Medical Council released a study in 1998 saying that out of the 1,394 men interviewed, 50% physically abused their female partners at their homes.<ref name=jewkes>Jewkes, Rachel, Jonathan Levin, and Loveday Penn-Kekana. "Risk factors for Domestic violence: findings from a South African cross-sectional study." Social Science & Medicine 55 (2002): 1603–17. Print.</ref>  Considering how recently domestic violence has come to light, it is still considered an early movement. The United Nations found that violence against women was a universal problem. Another study done in 2010 found that a majority of men and over half of women that were surveyed believed that women should obey their husbands.Breetzke, G.D. "Understanding the magnitude and extent of crime in post-apartheid South Africa." Social Identities 18.3 (2012): 299–315. Print. It is not uncommon for the abuse to begin while the girls are still teenagers. It is not uncommon for women to tolerate the abuse they are receiving because it is such a common practice in South Africa.

Prevalence
In a study done by the World Health Organization, it was found that 60,000 women and children are victims of domestic violence in South Africa. It is hard to gather accurate statistical data in South Africa because domestic violence is rarely reported. On average, in a cross-sectional study conducted in 2002, the women who were abused came from a lower secondary education and were unemployed. The same study indicated that 9.5 percent of women reported being abused within the past year (working back from 2002); in some areas of the country it rose to 28.4 percent of women who reported being abused. In 2013, 50 percent of the women surveyed reported that they had suffered emotional and verbal abuse. Of the women who were in violent relationships, 45.9 percent of them reported injury. In the same study it was found that typically the women who do witness and feel the violence come from a rural childhood compared to those raised in an urban area. Although there are many places that do offer help to those suffering from domestic violence, those resources are more available in urban areas. In rural areas it is harder to access proper resources. Nearly half of the female murders that happened in 1999 in South Africa resulted from domestic violence.

In a study conducted in 2002 by R. Jewkes et al. 24.6% of all women, and 24.3% of black African women, experienced physical violence during their lifetime. Black African women were less likely to ever experience physical violence or to experience physical violence in the past year than were women of other races. The women in this sample were from the province of Eastern Cape, Mpumalanga, and Northern Province with a mean age of 31.

Recent research has found that binge drinking was associated with intimate partner violence perpetration, and that problematic alcohol use can be a predictor of intimate partner violence and domestic violence perpetration. Additionally, men with a history of exposure to violence were more likely to have difficulty with self-control as it relates to violence towards a partner in certain situations compared to men without a history of exposure to violence.

Rape and sexually transmitted diseases

In 2012 South Africa was called the "rape capital of the world" when less than 1% of rapes that occur are reported to the police. The South African Medical Research Council did an electronic anonymous survey, interviewing just over 1,700 men, that found that one in four males had raped; 73% of those men surveyed had raped before the age of 20. Within rural South Africa there is a higher rate of HIV between partners. In Limpopo, a team of researches traveled to rural villages to implement a three-part trial to test if intervention within relationships that had domestic violence and/ or HIV prevalence in the home. The homes where the researchers just assisted with the problems of domestic violence were able to reduce the prevalence by 55%, but did not effect those who had unprotected sexual intercourse with a non-spousal partner. Although the rate of domestic violence within these small villages did get reduced; the rate of those having unprotected intercourse after being exposed, and diagnosed with HIV, did not go down. According to reports by the U.N., South Africa has one of the highest rates of HIV/AIDS in the world.

Legal actions
Until South Africa established non-racial democracy in the 1990s, no law to define domestic violence or protect those who are victims of domestic violence ever existed.
Within South Africa, the 1996 Constitution says in section 12c that: "Everyone has the right to freedom and security of person, that includes the right to be free from violence from either public and private sources." The constitution also takes time to highlight that South Africa is based on "non-sexism" values.

Many successful policies have been put in place to help, mostly women, find help escape or refuge from the violence. Human rights throughout the world have viewed sexual violence as a negative situation. After the United Nations held multiple human rights conventions (including the World Conference on Human Rights (1993), International Conference on Population and Development (1994), and the Fourth World Conference on Women (1995) the global agenda for violence against women changed. The advocacy group Soul City broadcast a show on TV and radio in 1995 that highlighted the issues associated with domestic violence. Soul City, along with the National Network on Violence against Women, set up a 24-hour crisis telephone line to help vulnerable women who are struggling with domestic violence.

Domestic Violence Act
In 1998, South Africa introduced the Domestic Violence Act to try and protect those who are being abused or might be forced into a situation that could become harmful in the future. At the time, the biggest assistance to women came from the Protection Order that derives from the Domestic Violent Act. The Protection Order permits the courts to prevent the accused from continuing abuse. The collaboration process between representatives of the Department of Justice, Safety and Security, Health Education, Welfare, Correctional Services and the National Directorate for Public Prosecution was a delaying factor that slowed down the process of changing the policies. Within the first year of the Domestic Violence Act being created, 1,696 applications were submitted for protective orders. In a report done by the United Nations Division of the Advancement of Women, they discovered about the protective orders that women were able to fill out, that the forms were only available in two out of the eleven languages that are spoken in South Africa. Other reforms that were created were to sentence mandatory minimal time for specific types of rape under the Criminal Law Amendment Act 1997.

Notable cases of domestic violence in South Africa
Oscar Pistorius
Oscar Pistorius was accused and charged with murdering his girlfriend on February 14, 2013. The "Blade Runner", as he is known, shot 30-year-old model Reeva Steenkamp through the bathroom door of their home with a 9mm pistol he said he kept under his bed. Oscar Pistorius, who was 27 years old at the time of the shooting, stated that he believed it was an intruder in the bathroom, and not his girlfriend, after hearing the sound of the window being opened. The couple had been in a relationship since 2012 after attending an award show together. Pistorius’ previous girlfriend, model Samantha Taylor, was put on the stand during the trial to testify about Pistorius' gun use prior to the February 14 shooting. In Taylor's statement, she described Pistorius always having his gun with him, even when visiting friends, and frequently waking up during the night in fear about potential intruders. The prosecutors also believe that Pistorius had shot Steenkamp because of arguments they had had earlier that day.

Charlize Theron
Actress Charlize Theron grew up in a home where she witnessed such abuse. She is known for starring in various films such as: Italian Job, Snow White and the Huntsman, and Hancock''. Theron grew up outside Johannesburg with her parents. Theron's father was an alcoholic and threatened her and her mother one night. During that incident, Theron's mother shot and killed the father, but was not charged because it was ruled as self-defence.

Trevor Noah
Talk show host Trevor Noah grew up in a household where his mother faced abuse. In 2009, his step-father pleaded guilty to attempting to murder his mother. Noah highlighted corruption within the police system, claiming that his mother had reached out for years to police for help, but that dockets went missing and cases never went to court.

See also
 Women in South Africa
 Crime in South Africa

References

Law of South Africa
Women's rights in South Africa
South Africa
Family in South Africa